The Metalcraft Tournament was a golf tournament held in New Zealand from 1963 to 1967. Peter Thomson won the event twice, tying in 1963 and winning  outright in 1965.

Winners

References

Golf tournaments in New Zealand
Recurring sporting events established in 1963
Recurring events disestablished in 1967
1963 establishments in New Zealand
1967 disestablishments in New Zealand